Opanara is a genus of small air-breathing land snails, terrestrial pulmonate gastropod mollusks in the family Endodontidae.

Species
Species within the genus Opanara include:
 Opanara altiapica
 Opanara areaensis
 Opanara bitridentata
 Opanara caliculata
 Opanara depasoapicata
 Opanara duplicidentata
 Opanara fosbergi
 Opanara megomphala
 Opanara perahuensis

References

 
Taxonomy articles created by Polbot